Memories on Stone is a 2014 Kurdish-language German-Iraqi film directed by Shawkat Amin Korki. It was produced by mitosfilm and mitosfilm Iraq. It describes the struggles of schoolfriends Alan and Hussein of making a post-war film about the Anfal genocide during Saddam Hussein's regime. The film was selected as the Iraqi entry for the Best Foreign Language Film at the 88th Academy Awards but it was not nominated.

Cast
 Hussein Hassan
 Nazmi Kirik
 Shima Molaei
 Ala Riani

See also
 List of submissions to the 88th Academy Awards for Best Foreign Language Film
 List of Iraqi submissions for the Academy Award for Best Foreign Language Film
 Kurdish cinema

References

External links
 

2014 films
2014 drama films
Iraqi drama films
German drama films
Kurdish-language films
2010s German films